The Key Coalition ( / Koalicija Ključ) was an opposition political alliance in Montenegro. It was composed of the Democratic Alliance (DEMOS), Socialist People's Party (SNP) and United Reform Action (URA). The main goal of the coalition was to overthrow the ruling Democratic Party of Socialists of Montenegro (DPS) of Milo Đukanović, which has been in power since 1991. Miodrag Lekić led the joint electoral list in the parliamentary election in October 2016. 

The coalition ran in the 2016 parliamentary election under the slogan "The best for Montenegro!". However, following the election, in which the Key Coalition won 11.05% of the votes and 9 seats, its member parties went on to create separate parliamentary groups and the coalition was de facto dissolved.

Elections

Parliamentary election

Member parties

References

2016 establishments in Montenegro
Defunct political party alliances in Montenegro
Pro-European political parties in Montenegro